Danielys Herranz Reyes (born 26 January 1999) is a Cuban handball player for Matanzas and the Cuban national team.

She represented Cuba at the 2019 World Women's Handball Championship.

References

1999 births
Living people
Cuban female handball players
21st-century Cuban women